This is the discography of American rapper Willie D.

Studio albums

Compilation albums
Relentless (2001)

Charting singles

External links

Hip hop discographies
Discographies of American artists